The Women's 3 metre springboard competition of the diving events at the 2015 World Aquatics Championships was held on 31 July–1 August 2015.

Results
The preliminary round was held on 31 July at 10:00. The semifinal was held on 31 July at 15:00. The final was held on 1 August at 19:30.

Green denotes finalists

Blue denotes semifinalists

References

Women's 3 metre springboard